Babotinac is a village in the municipality of Prokuplje, Serbia. According to the 2002 census, the village had a population of 270.

References

Populated places in Toplica District